The ASEAN Basketball League (ABL) is an international professional men's basketball league in the Far East Asia, composed of eight teams including six clubs from Southeast Asia (Indonesia, Malaysia, the Philippines, Singapore, Thailand and Vietnam), in addition to Hong Kong and Macau. Former teams have included Taiwan and Brunei. The league was proposed in Kuala Lumpur, Malaysia and launched its inaugural season on 1 October 2009.

History

Formation
Basketball officials from 6 ASEAN nations gathered in Metro Manila on 1 September 2009 to officially launch the new league.[In its inaugural season, there were six participating teams from different nations in Southeast Asia:

League expansion
On 22 September 2011, the Brunei Barracudas announced that they were bowing out of the third season of ABL after participating for 2 seasons. On 20 October 2011, the Saigon Sports Academy officially announced the participation of Saigon Heat into the third season of ABL, making them the first ever international professional basketball team to represent Vietnam.

In the same season, San Miguel Beermen and Bangkok Cobras joined the league along with Saigon Heat. Unfortunately, the Beermen left the ABL after winning the title in 2013. The Cobras also left the league after one season. Further, in 2014, Laskar Dreya South Sumatra (INA) joined and played for a season.

In 2015, Pilipinas MX3 Kings and Mono Vampire joined the league and both teams left in 2016. On 17 July 2016, Kaohsiung Truth from Kaohsiung, Taiwan announced that they will participate in the 2016–17 season. In the same year, the Eastern Basketball Club confirmed its participation in the league. The two teams were the first teams from outside Southeast Asia to compete in the league.

The Philippines returned in the league with Alab Pilipinas on 6 August 2016. In September 2017, ABL confirmed four new teams for the 2017–18 season: CLS Knights Indonesia, Formosa Dreamers, the returning Mono Vampire Basketball Club, and the Nanhai Kung Fu after the Kaoshiung Truth disbanded after the seventh season of ABL.

After the 2018 season, the Kung Fu moved to Macau and became the Macau Black Bears, while the league announced the addition of the Zhuhai Wolf Warriors, based in Zhuhai in the Pearl River delta. On 9 September 2019, the league confirmed the entry of the third team from Taiwan, Taipei Fubon Braves situated in Taipei after Formosa Dreamers and disbanded Kaohsiung Truth. Fubon Braves secured the best record in the Super Basketball League and capped it off with the SBL championship after sweeping the Finals series in four games. They are also one of the eight teams to compete in the 2019 FIBA Asia Champions Cup.

COVID-19 pandemic
The 2019-20 ABL season was halted due to the COVID-19 pandemic in March 2020 placing the status of the ABL in uncertainty. The withdrawal of Mono Vampires, the reports of Taiwanese teams planning to join a domestic league, and the inactivity of the league's social media site were among the factors that fueled speculations that the ABL itself would fold. However, an ABL co-owner dispelled such rumors committing the resumption of the league stating that they plan to hold the eleventh season in 2021. Plans to resume the league were postponed again with the new starting date for the season initially being in February 2022. The start date was pushed back again a month later to September. The plan did not proceed as plan. In October, the ABL through social media announced that it is returning without providing anymore details.

ABL Resumed
After many speculations and rumours, the 2023 ABL season finally begin the new season in Singapore 2 January 2023 with series format due to Covid concerned for players and staff safety. 8 Teams will take the participation under the title ABL Invitational 2023. 4 Teams from 2020 season return to ABL (Hong Kong Eastern, Macau Black Bears, Saigon Heat, and Singapore Slingers) and 4 new teams joined the ABL (Bangkok Tigers, Louvre Indonesia, NS Matrix, and Zamboanga Valientes).

Teams

Current teams

Former teams 

1 The Republic of China, commonly known as Taiwan, due to complicated relations with the People's Republic of China, is recognized by the name Chinese Taipei by most of the international organizations in sports competitions. For more information, please see Cross-Strait relations.

Champions
The finals is a best-of-5 (2–2–1) series (2010, 2013, 2016–2019) and is a best-of-3 (1–1–1) series (2011, 2012, 2014, 2023)

 ^ finished regular season with the best win–loss record.

Championship table by club
This medal ranking is based on the club/team representation.

 Bold: teams that are still active
Italic: teams from outside Southeast Asia

Individual awards
ABL presents five individual awards to players: the Local MVP, World Import MVP, ASEAN Heritage MVP, and the Defensive Player of the Year. The Coach of the Year award is given to the league's best head coach of the season.

Prior to the 2015–16 ABL season, there was only one MVP award for imports and was called the Best Import award. It was divided into two for World Imports (for players hailing from outside Southeast Asia and to the ASEAN Heritage Imports (for players from other Southeast Asian countries or players with at least one Southeast Asian parent). Also, the Defensive Player of the Year and Coach of the Year awards were only awarded since the 2012 season.

Most Valuable Players

Locals

World Imports

Heritage Imports

Finals

Special Awards

Defensive Player of the Year

Coach of the Year

See also
ABL 3x3 International Champions Cup
East Asia Super League
West Asia Super League
FIBA Asia Champions Cup

References

 
International club basketball competitions
Sports leagues established in 2009
Multi-national professional sports leagues
Basketball leagues in Asia
2009 establishments in Asia
Tune Group